Vincent N. Schiraldi (born January 3, 1959) is an American juvenile justice policy reformer and activist who has served as the Maryland Secretary of Juvenile Services since 2023. He was previously a senior research scientist at the Columbia University School of Social Work from October 2017 to January 2023. He is known for advocating for trying suspects under the age of 21 in juvenile court, and for programs that supervise older inmates and erase their records if they find a job. His advocacy for more lenient treatment of youth offenders has been controversial: youth advocates have praised his reforms for providing outlets for juveniles, while some law enforcement officers have questioned whether his policies have been too lenient.

Biography
Schiraldi grew up in a working-class neighborhood in Brooklyn, New York. He received his Bachelor of Arts degree from Binghamton University and his MSW from New York University. He reformed the Center on Juvenile and Criminal Justice in 1991, and served as its director until 2002, when he founded the Justice Policy Institute (JPI). He then served as the director of the JPI until 2005, when he became the director of the District of Columbia's Department of Youth Rehabilitation Services. As director of the Department, he argued that juveniles should not be punished as harshly, and that incentives are a better way to reduce juvenile misbehavior. In 2010, he became Commissioner of the New York City Department of Probation, a position he held until 2014, when he became a senior advisor to mayor Bill de Blasio in the New York City Mayor’s Office of Criminal Justice. From March 2014 to September 2015, he was senior adviser to Elizabeth Glazer, director of the Mayor's Office of Criminal Justice. He was a senior research fellow at Harvard University's Kennedy School of Government from 2015 until he joined Columbia's faculty in October 2017. In 2021, he was appointed Commissioner of the New York City Department of Corrections.

Maryland Secretary of Juvenile Services
On January 12, 2023, Governor-elect Wes Moore named Schiraldi as the Maryland Secretary of Juvenile Services. He took office as on January 18, 2023. His nomination was the most controversial of Moore's cabinet nominees, with Maryland Senate Republicans, including Senate Minority Leader Stephen S. Hershey Jr., saying that Schiraldi was "a little progressive for some of our members" and others scrutinizing his approach to juvenile justice. On February 21, the Maryland Senate voted 33–14 along party lines to approve Schiraldi's nomination, making him the only member of Moore's cabinet not to receive a unanimous vote.

References

Living people
Binghamton University alumni
New York University alumni
Columbia University School of Social Work faculty
People from Brooklyn
Harvard Kennedy School faculty
1959 births
State cabinet secretaries of Maryland

Commissioners in New York City